Pir Baha ol Din (also Romanized as Pīr Bahā' ol Dīn and Pīr Bahā' od Dīn) is a village in Il Gavark Rural District, in the Central District of Bukan County, West Azerbaijan Province, Iran. At the 2006 census, its population was 133, in 18 families.

References 

Populated places in Bukan County